Musti is a cartoon character, created by Flemish Belgian graphic artist Ray Goossens.

Musti is a little 4-year-old kitten, living with his mother and father in a little house in a rural village, surrounded by a large garden with animals and trees. Musti's mouth is represented as an x. Musti was first created in 1969, though rumors stated that he was created in 1945. The character has been featured in animated TV series since then.

Television series

In 1969, Musti was developed into an animated series. In every episode, a specific story is told in a couple of minutes. The subjects are always linked to the world of small children, combining anthropomorphic animals and realistic situations. This series was first broadcast on Flemish television, with Rachel Frederix as narrator. In the Netherlands, Musti appeared on television in 1980. The narrators were Arnold Gelderman and Marijke Merckens. In the 1990s a second series was made, with a white background, with Musti's original pronunciation, Muh-sti, now changed to Moo-sti. In total, 156 episodes have been made, airing in two dozen countries.

In 2007, a new television series was created. Instead of flat 2D images with a white background, the new series is entirely rendered in 3D. The narrator is Kristel Van Craen. It airs in Belgium, the Netherlands, Israel, Norway, Japan, Croatia, Portugal and the United States on BabyFirst TV. Al-Jazeera aired the series throughout the Arabic world.

Books
The Flemish publisher Standaard Uitgeverij carries an extensive portfolio of Musti children's books, targeting children aged 3–6.

Dupuis printed a number of Musti children's comics in French, based on the character's appearances in the magazine Bonne Soirée.

Software
Educational software programs have been developed with Musti as the lead character developed by Stefan Bracke. 
They are currently only available in Dutch.

International airings 
 Argentina: América 2
 Australia: Canal ABC
 Bolivia: Red ATB
 Bulgaria: Super 7
 Canada: Treehouse TV, 2007-2011
 Chile: Canal 13, on the children's show Cubox
 Colombia: Señal Colombia
 Cuba: Multivisión
 Ecuador: Ecuador TV
 El Salvador: Canal 19 local (Nickelodeon)
 France: France 5 Teletoon
 Germany: KiKa
 India: Disney Junior
 Israel: Arutz HaYeladim
 Italy: Rai YoYo and Rai 2
 Japan: NHK, WOWOW
 Latin America: Discovery Kids
 Mexico: Canal 5
 Panama: FETV Canal 5
 Poland: TVP1
 Portugal: Canal Panda and RTP2
 Scandinavia: Playhouse Disney
 Southeast Asia: Disney Channel
 South Korea: EBS
 Spain: Clan and Boomerang
 Sweden: SVT and STVB
 Turkey: TRT
 Uruguay: Canal 5 - Televisión Nacional Uruguay
 United States: BabyFirst TV
 Venezuela: TVes and Cartoon Network

See also
 Miffy
 Hello Kitty

References

External links
 Official Musti website

Comics characters introduced in 1945
1968 Belgian television series debuts
Fictional cats
Dupuis titles
Children's television characters
Fictional characters from Flanders